The Women's Basketball Coaches Association Player of the Year award is presented annually to the best women's college basketball players in NCAA Division II and Division III as voted by the WBCA membership. From 1983 to 2000, the award was also given to the best player in Division I. The award was first presented in 1983. The award was presented by Champion from 1983 to 1994, by Rawlings from 1995 to 2002, and by State Farm from 2003 to 2015.

Winners

Division I

Division II

Division III

See also

 List of sports awards honoring women

Notes

College basketball player of the year awards in the United States
College basketball trophies and awards in the United States
College women's basketball in the United States
Sports awards honoring women
Awards established in 1983
Awards disestablished in 2000
1983 establishments in the United States
College sports trophies and awards in the United States